Leuconitocris angustifrons is a species of beetle in the family Cerambycidae. It was described by Harold in 1878.

References

Leuconitocris
Beetles described in 1878